Daharki railway station is located in Daharki city, Ghotki district of Sindh province, Pakistan.

See also
 List of railway stations in Pakistan
 Pakistan Railways

References

External links

Railway stations in Ghotki District
Railway stations on Karachi–Peshawar Line (ML 1)